Evan Comerford (born 1998) is a Gaelic footballer who plays for the Ballymun Kickhams club and at senior level for the Dublin county team.

He has a namesake County Tipperary footballer, Evan Comerford, with whom he has sometimes been confused.

References

1998 births
Living people
Ballymun Kickhams Gaelic footballers
DCU Gaelic footballers
Dublin inter-county Gaelic footballers
Gaelic football goalkeepers
Sportspeople from Dublin (city)